May Sabai Phoo (born 31 July 1996) is a Burmese footballer who plays as a midfielder. She has been a member of the Myanmar women's national team.

International career
May Sabai Phoo represented Myanmar at the 2015 AFC U-19 Women's Championship. At senior level, she capped during the 2014 AFC Women's Asian Cup and the 2016 AFF Women's Championship.

See also
List of Myanmar women's international footballers

References

1996 births
Living people
Burmese women's footballers
Myanmar women's international footballers
Women's association football midfielders
Sportspeople from Yangon
Southeast Asian Games bronze medalists for Myanmar
Southeast Asian Games medalists in football
Competitors at the 2017 Southeast Asian Games